Steve Witt (born 10 June 1982) is a former professional rugby league footballer who played in the 2000s.  Witt played all of his top-level rugby league for the Newcastle Knights.

Background
Witt was born in Toowoomba, Queensland.  Witt played junior football for the Parramatta Eels with his younger brother Michael. Never making first-grade for the Eels.

Playing career
Witt made his NRL debut on 10 April 2004. Witt went on to play in 19 matches over two seasons for the Knights.

References

1982 births
Living people
Australian rugby league players
Newcastle Knights players
Rugby league halfbacks
Rugby league five-eighths
Rugby league players from Toowoomba